Rafael Paullier (born 24 February 1932) is a Uruguayan equestrian. He competed in two events at the 1960 Summer Olympics.

References

External links
 

1932 births
Possibly living people
Uruguayan male equestrians
Olympic equestrians of Uruguay
Equestrians at the 1960 Summer Olympics
Sportspeople from Montevideo
20th-century Uruguayan people
21st-century Uruguayan people